Robins is an unincorporated community in Guernsey County, in the U.S. state of Ohio.

History
A post office called Robins was established in 1887, and remained in operation until 1968. The community was named after one Mr. Robins, a local merchant.

References

Unincorporated communities in Guernsey County, Ohio
Unincorporated communities in Ohio